One Million in Jewels is a 1923 American silent crime film directed by J.P. McGowan and starring Helen Holmes, Elinor Fair and McGowan. It was shot in Miami, New York and Havana.

Synopsis
A secret service agent is assigned to track a gang smuggling valuable jewels from Cuba into the United States. However, things are complicated when he falls in love with one of the members of the organization.

Cast
 Helen Holmes as 	Helen Morgan
 J.P. McGowan as 	Burke
 Elinor Fair as 	Sylvia Ellis
 Nellie Parker Spaulding as 	Jane Angle
 Charles Craig as 	George Beresford
 Leslie Casey as 	William Abbott
 H.H. Pattee as 	Morgan

References

Bibliography
 Connelly, Robert B. The Silents: Silent Feature Films, 1910-36, Volume 40, Issue 2. December Press, 1998.
 Munden, Kenneth White. The American Film Institute Catalog of Motion Pictures Produced in the United States, Part 1. University of California Press, 1997.

External links
 

1923 films
1923 crime films
American silent feature films
American crime films
American black-and-white films
Films directed by J. P. McGowan
Films shot in Florida
Films shot in Cuba
Films set in Cuba
1920s English-language films
1920s American films